Khamla may be,

Khamla Pinkeo
Phira-on Khamla

See also
Khamla Khedi, Madhya Pradesh
the supposed Khamla 'language' is just the speech of the Gowari caste.